Cheshire East is a unitary authority area with borough status in the ceremonial county of Cheshire, England. The local authority is Cheshire East Council. Towns within the area include Crewe, Macclesfield, Congleton, Sandbach, Wilmslow, Handforth, Knutsford, Poynton, Bollington, Alsager and Nantwich. The council is based in the town of Sandbach.

History

The borough council was established in April 2009 as part of the 2009 structural changes to local government in England, by virtue of an order under the Local Government and Public Involvement in Health Act 2007. It is an amalgamation of the former boroughs of Macclesfield, Congleton and Crewe and Nantwich, and includes the functions of the former Cheshire County Council. The residual part of the disaggregated former County Council, together with the other three former Cheshire borough councils (Chester City, Ellesmere Port & Neston and Vale Royal) were, similarly, amalgamated to create the new unitary council of Cheshire West and Chester.

Cheshire East has historic links to textile mills of the industrial revolution, such as seen at Quarry Bank Mill. It is also home to Tatton Park, a historic estate that hosts RHS Show Tatton Park.

Geography

Cheshire East lies within North West England. It borders Cheshire West and Chester to the west, Greater Manchester to the north, Derbyshire to the east as well as Staffordshire and Shropshire to the south. It is home to the Cheshire Plain and the southern hills of the Pennines. The local geology is mostly glacial clay, as well as glacial sands and gravel.

Climate
According to the Köppen climate classification, like most areas of the UK, the climate is classified as “oceanic” or “Cfb”.

Demography

According to the United Kingdom Census 2011 Cheshire East has a population of 370,127 people.

Ethnicity

According to the 2011 Census, ethnic white groups (British, Irish, Other) account for 96.7% of the population (357,940 people), with 3.3% of the population (12,187 people) being in ethnic groups other than white (Asian, Black, Other).

Religion

A breakdown of religious groups and denominations:
Christian: 68.9% (254,940 people)
Buddhist: 0.2% (882 people)
Hindu: 0.4% (1,328 people)
Jewish: 0.2% (581 people)
Muslim: 0.7% (2,438 people)
Sikh: 0.1% (279 people)
Other religions: 0.3% (1,065 people) 
No religion: 22.7% (83,973 people)
Religion not stated: 6.7% (24,641 people)

Administration

Wards
The 52 wards of Cheshire East are:

Notes

Members of Parliament

Notes

Elections

At the last Cheshire County Council election in 2005 there were 15 Conservative controlled wards, 6 Labour controlled wards, 5 Liberal Democrat controlled wards and 1 ward controlled by an independent within the unitary authority boundaries.

The first elections for Cheshire East Council took place on 1 May 2008, with the Conservative Party taking overall control. The Conservatives took 59 of the 81 seats with the others being held by the Liberal Democrats (12), Labour (6), 3 members of Middlewich First and one Independent. The first leader of the authority was Wesley Fitzgerald who was elected at Cheshire East's inaugural meeting on 13 May 2008. Wesley Fitzgerald is a Councillor for the Wilmslow South ward. Having decided in February 2012 to step down, a leadership contest was triggered. Michael Jones – a relatively new councillor having been elected in the May 2011 elections – was elected as the Leader of the Conservative Group on 17 March 2012.

The administrative centre for Cheshire East Council is Westfields in Sandbach, the former Headquarters of Congleton Borough Council. The site could be expanded if needed as there is space around the newly built centre. Cheshire East is an observer member of the Association of Greater Manchester Authorities of Greater Manchester, which borders Cheshire to the north.

Transport

Roads
Motorways and primary routes in the borough which are maintained by National Highways (trunk roads de jure) include the M6, M56 and the A556. Other primary routes which are maintained by the council (principal roads de jure) include the A6, A34, A49, A50, A51, A54, A56, A500, A523, A525, A530, A534, A536, A537, A538, A555, A556, A5020 and A5033.

Major road projects
A556 Knutsford to Bowdon Improvement: A new five-mile four-lane dual-carriageway bypass of Bucklow Hill and Mere Crossroads on the A556 has been  by Highways England at a cost of between £165-£221 million. The new road contains the first 'green bridge' wildlife crossing in the United Kingdom. The existing road has been narrowed to one lane in each direction and re-designated as the B5569 under the maintenance of Cheshire East Council.

M6 Junctions 16-19: Smart Motorway: Highways England are preparing to convert the hard shoulder to a permanent running lane and introduce a variable speed limit along this section of the M6, meaning that it will become the first smart motorway in Cheshire. The scheme is expected to cost between £192-£274 million.

Crewe Green Link Road South: A dual-carriageway extension of Crewe Green Link Road is being constructed between the A5020 and Weston Gate Roundabout on the A500 by Cheshire East Council at a cost of £26.5 million.

LED improvements: The Cheshire East Council, for multiple years now, has been investing in LEDs (light emitting diodes) as they are energy-efficient lights that are more likely to avoid sleepiness on the road as of their blue tint.

Rail

Buses
Arriva north west and D&G bus are the primary operators of buses in cheshire east serving the county Monday to Saturday.Sunday services are limited to 84 chester to crewe operated by arriva ,3 crewe to hanley operated by First potteries and 58 operated by high peak
Macclesfield to chatsworth House via Buxton. Additional services are operated by Aimees travel,High Peak,Mickro coaches,Little Gem and Stagecoach Manchester and Warringtons own buses.

Local sites of interest
The area is home to a large number of sites of public interest:
Tatton Park is the venue for a variety of events: classical concerts; fireworks displays; classic car shows; open-air theatre and the Country Show (massed pipes and drums, sheepdog trials, competitions, crafts fair, and dancing).
the Tatton Estate is privately owned with over 1,000 people living and working on it in town (Knutsford), in villages such as Rostherne and Ashley, and in the rural parishes surrounding.  The new Ashley Hall Showground and Event Centre hosts events such as the Cheshire Ploughing and Hedge Laying Competition, the Ashley Hall Traction Engine Rally and charity barn dances.
Jodrell Bank Observatory is home to a number of significant radio telescopes including the Lovell Telescope; and is involved in a range of international research projects such as MERLIN.
Gawsworth Hall is a half-timbered hall, and possibly once home to Shakespeare's 'Dark Lady'. Concerts are held in the grounds, and each summer there is an open-air theatre season, featuring Shakespearean classics and light opera, comedy, jazz, and drama.
Cuckooland Museum is a reputed museum which exhibits the world's largest and finest collection of antique cuckoo clocks.
Arley Hall is a Victorian-Jacobean Grade II listed country house, sometimes used as locations for filming. There have been two Coronation Street weddings filmed here.
Quarry Bank Mill is set in the village of Styal and is a working water-mill and living museum.
Capesthorne Hall is a Jacobean-style stately home which plays host to a variety of events.
Alderley Edge is a great sandstone escarpment that overlooks the Cheshire plain. The Edge itself has been mined for copper since at least the time of the Roman invasion, and is the centre of the legend of the Wizard of Alderley, made famous by local author Alan Garner's books The Weirdstone of Brisingamen and The Moon of Gomrath. Nowadays it is said that the Wizard was Merlin, but this is an addition that only appeared over the past thirty years. Tours of the mines are available, but should not be attempted without an experienced guide – the Edge is riddled with mineshafts.
St James' and St Paul's Church, Marton is a 14th-century house of worship which lies on an artificial mound or earthwork.
Knutsford is best known as the site where King Canute forded the Lily Stream, and as the home of Victorian author Elizabeth Gaskell, and the town holds a May Day parade and festival every year.
Lyme Park is an estate and park located near Disley. Lyme Hall is the principal feature of the park.
Little Moreton Hall is one of the country's best-preserved half-timbered and moated manor houses.
Sandbach Crosses are two Anglo-Saxon stone crosses now erected in the market place in the town of Sandbach, Cheshire, England . They are recognised as a Grade I listed building and a scheduled monument.
Old Hall Hotel in Sandbach is a Grade I listed building. The Hall is on English Heritage's Buildings at Risk Register as priority A, this is the highest grading.

Twin towns 
The former borough of Macclesfield was twinned with Eckernförde, Germany.

Congleton has been twinned with Trappes since 16 September 1962

Twinning remains active in the Crewe and Nantwich area. The town of Crewe began twinning with the town of Mâcon in France in 1957. This continued when the borough of Crewe and Nantwich was formed in 1974. The borough added the town of Bischofsheim in Germany in 1991. In 2003 the administration of twinning was passed to CANTA, the Crewe and Nantwich Twinning Association, a voluntary association supported by the borough. The association immediately added Dzierżoniów in Poland as a Friendship Town. The association has received continuing support from Cheshire East after the borough became part of the new authority.

References

External links 

 Cheshire East Council Website
 Cheshire Market towns
 CANTA the Crewe and Nantwich Twinning Association

 
Unitary authority districts of England
English unitary authorities created in 2009
Districts of Cheshire
Cheshire and Warrington Local Enterprise Partnership
Boroughs in England